Scotland sent a team of athletes 1998 Commonwealth Games in Kuala Lumpur, Malaysia. Winning 3 gold, 2 Silver and 7 Bronze. Finishing 11th in the medal table.

Medals

Gold

Boxing:
 Alex Arthur, Featherweight (57 kg)

Bowls:
 Margaret Letham and Joyce Lindores, Women's doubles

Squash:
 Peter Nicol, Men's singles

Silver
Athletics:
 Allison Curbishley, Woman 400 m

Swimming:
 Alison Sheppard, 50 m freestyle

Bronze

Boxing:
 Colin McNeil, Welterweight (67 kg)

Boxing:
 Jackie Townsley, Light middleweight (71 kg)

Badminton:
 Elinor Middlemiss & Sandra Watt, Women's doubles

Shooting:
 Shirley McIntosh & Janis Thomson, Women's 50m Three-Positions Rifle pairs

Shooting:
 Shirley McIntosh & Susan Bell, Women's 50m Prone Rifle pairs

Shooting:
 David Rattray & Robin Law, Men's 10m Air Rifle pairs

Squash:
 Stuart Cowie & Peter Nicol Men's doubles

See also
 Commonwealth Games Council for Scotland

References

1998
Nations at the 1998 Commonwealth Games
Commonwealth Games